The Orlando Anarchy are a women's American football team based in the Orlando metropolitan area. They currently play in the Women's Football Alliance. They play their home games at Trinity Preparatory School in the city of Winter Park, FL.

The team was founded in 2010 as the Central Florida Anarchy, starting play in the first year of the WFA. They filled a void in women's football in Orlando  left by the demise of the Independent Women's Football League's Orlando Mayhem.

The mission of the Orlando Anarchy is to provide opportunities for female players to participate in professional tackle football in a safe, positive, and fun environment while fostering sportsmanship, teamwork, community, and individual improvement.

After many seasons of struggling the Orlando Anarchy became the 2017 WFA Tier III National Conference Champions. The Orlando Anarchy made it to the WFA Bowl Weekend in Pittsburgh, PA in 2017. They were defeated in the Tier III Championship game by the Arkansas Wildcats.

After their Championship defeat in 2017 the Orlando Anarchy came back with a fire and desire to not only make it back to the Championship game but to win it. In 2018 the Orlando Anarchy returned in a dominant fashion and ended their regular season with a 7–1 record. In the postseason they remained dominant winning all 3 playoff games and becoming back to back WFA Tier III National Conference Champions on their way to a rematch with the Arkansas Wildcats from the previous year in the 2018 Tier III National Championship.

The Orlando Anarchy became the 2018 WFA Tier III National Champions with a dominant showcase on offense and defense to the tune of a 46–0 victory over the Arkansas Wildcats.

The Orlando Anarchy's 2022 roster boasted several All-Americans.

Season-by-season

|-
| colspan="6" align="center" | Central Florida Anarchy (WFA)
|-
|2010 || 4 || 4 || 0 || 2nd National South Central || Lost NC Quarterfinal (Jacksonville)
|-
| colspan="6" align="center" | Orlando Anarchy (WFA)
|-
|2011 || 5 || 3 || 0 || 2nd National South Atlantic || --
|-
|2012 || 1 || 2 || 0 || 3rd WFA National 9 || --
|-
|2013 || 0 || 8 || 0 ||  || --
|-
|2014 || 1 || 7 || 0 ||  || --
|-
|2015 || 0 || 8 || 0 || Season not completed due to injuries  || --
|-
|2016 || 0 || 8 || 0 ||  || --
|-
|2017* || 8 || 3 || 0 || 2017 WFA Tier III National Conference Champions || Lost in WBOWL Tier III Championship Game (Arkansas Wildcats)
|-
|2018 || 11 || 1 || 0 || 2018 WFA Tier III National Conference Champions || Won in WBOWL Tier III Championship Game (Arkansas Wildcats)
|-
|2019 || 9 || 2 || 0 || 2019 WFA Tier III National Conference Champions || Lost in WBOWL Tier III Championship Game (Nevada Storm)
|-
|2020 || 0 || 0 || 0 || 2020 Season Cancelled due to Covid || 
|-
|2021 || 2 || 4 || 0 ||  || 
|-
|2022 || 4 || 1 || 0 ||  || 
|-
!Totals || 45 || 51 || 0
|colspan="2"| (including playoffs)

* = Current standing

2010

Season schedule

2011

Standings

Season schedule

2012

Season schedule

2013

Season schedule

2014

Season schedule

2015

Season schedule

^ = Forfeit

2016

Season schedule

2017

Season schedule

^ = Forfeit

2018

Season schedule

2019

Season schedule

2020

Season schedule

2021

Season schedule

^ = Forfeit

2022

Season schedule

External links 
Orlando Anarchy website
Women's Football Alliance website

Women's Football Alliance teams
American football teams in Orlando, Florida
American football teams established in 2010
2010 establishments in Florida
Winter Park, Florida
Women in Florida